T.R. Carr was the mayor of the city of Hazelwood, Missouri in northern St. Louis County, Missouri, from April 2000 until April 2009.  He is Professor of Public Administration at Southern Illinois University Edwardsville (SIUE) and Senior Research Fellow at the Institute for Urban Research at SIUE. He has served as Department Chair of Public Administration and Policy Analysis and as Director of the Master of Public Administration Program at SIUE. Carr represents SIUE on the State University Retirement System Member Advisory Board.  

He is board member and Treasurer of the St. Louis – Samara (Russia) Sister City Committee.  Carr is a member of the Board of North County, Inc., an economic development organization in St. Louis County. He is a Commissioner on the St. Louis County Boundary Commission that reviews all municipal annexation plans within St. Louis County. He is a board member for the Northwest Chamber of Commerce in St. Louis County. Carr served on the Executive Board of the St. Louis County Municipal League and as League President 2007–2008.  

Carr served as chairman of the Standing Committee on Policy and Resolutions of the Missouri Municipal League 2004 to 2009. He served on the St. Louis County Fire Standards Commission 2005 – 2009.  He served on the East-West Gateway Council of Governments Board 2007–2009.  Carr served as a member, then as Chairman of the Community Advisory Board for SSM Hospital 2000–2009. 

He maintained these academic positions before, during, and after, his tenure as mayor.

References

External links 

News/Stories
 Demolition begins at former Ford plant in Hazelwood – St. Louis Post-Dispatch – August 7, 2008
 North County Inc. 2007 award recipients
 St. Louis Mills opens with a bang in Hazelwood – St. Louis Business Journal – November 13, 2003
 Best mayor – Riverfront Times – 2003
 Professor practices what he preaches – SIUE News – March 19, 2002

People from St. Louis County, Missouri